The United States Penitentiary, Marion (USP Marion) is a large medium-security United States federal prison for male and female inmates in Southern Precinct, unincorporated Williamson County, Illinois. It is operated by the Federal Bureau of Prisons, a division of the United States Department of Justice. The facility also has an adjacent satellite prison camp that houses minimum security male offenders.

History

Construction
USP Marion was built and opened in 1963 to replace the maximum security federal prison on Alcatraz Island in San Francisco, which closed the same year. The facility became the first control unit in the United States, when violence forced a long-term lockdown in 1983.

Birth of the "control-unit" prison
USP Marion was originally constructed to hold 500 of the most dangerous federal inmates, mostly transfers from Alcatraz.  Prison administrators aimed to maintain a safe and orderly environment and rehabilitate the inmates while avoiding the high-profile abuses that occurred at Alcatraz. They implemented a behavior modification program named Control and Rehabilitation Effort (CARE) in 1968.  Inmates in the program spent most of their time in solitary confinement or in "group therapy" sessions where they were berated for their deviant behavior and urged to change.  In 1973, the first blocks of "control unit" cells were created.  Inmates assigned to the control-unit would spend 23 to 24 hours a day in one-man cells that were specifically designed to severely limit or eliminate the inmate's contact with other people inside the prison and the outside world.

Notable incidents

High-profile escape attempts

The first escape from USP Marion was on July 21, 1971, when Warren George Briggs leapt over two 15 foot fences and escaped to Kansas City, Missouri via Interstate 57. Four days later, Warren turned himself in to the FBI. He reportedly did this so he could draw attention to his invention, a water desalting process that would enable mankind to purify water at a reasonable cost. 

On October 10, 1975, five inmates used a homemade electronic device to open the front gates of the prison. One of them had been an electrician and was assigned to work on the lock mechanisms of all of the doors in the main corridors. He also converted a radio into a remote control, with which he opened all of the doors. The five escapees were all eventually captured and returned to prison, the last one being apprehended in Canada on October 31, 1975.

Two escape attempts occurred in 1978 involving the same inmate, Garrett Brock Trapnell.  On May 24, 1978, Trapnell's friend, 43-year-old Barbara Ann Oswald, hijacked a St. Louis based charter helicopter and ordered the pilot, Allen Barklage, to fly to USP Marion.  Barklage complied, but he wrestled the gun away from Oswald and fatally shot her while he was landing in the prison yard, thwarting the escape. On December 21, 1978, Oswald's 17-year-old daughter, Robin Oswald, hijacked TWA Flight 541, which was en route from Louisville International Airport to Kansas City International Airport and threatened to detonate dynamite strapped to her body if the pilot did not fly to Williamson County Regional Airport, located only miles from USP Marion.  When the pilot landed at the airport in Marion, hundreds of law enforcement officers had responded. Robin Oswald surrendered to FBI negotiators at the Williamson airport without incident about ten hours later.  The dynamite was later found to be fake.

The last escape from the maximum-security prison area was on February 14, 1979, when Lawrence Caldwell, Albert Garza and Howard Zumberge climbed both exterior fences in a dense fog; Caldwell was caught before he could clear the first of the two fences.  Both Garza and Zumberge were apprehended three days later near Cypress, hiding in a church basement. During the capture of the escapees, Garza shot Johnson County Sheriff Elry Faulkner in the chest at almost point-blank range; Faulkner was wearing a bulletproof vest, however, and only suffered minor bruises.  Garza was shot and wounded, but survived and returned to Marion two months later.

Murders of Correction Officers Clutts and Hoffmann

On October 22, 1983, correctional officers Clutts and Hoffmann were killed in separate incidents only hours apart, both at the hands of members of the Aryan Brotherhood, a white-supremacist prison gang. Officer Clutts was stabbed to death by Thomas Silverstein.  While walking down a hall accompanied by Clutts, Silverstein was able to turn to the side and approach a particular cell. The prisoner in that cell subsequently unlocked Silverstein's handcuffs with a stolen key and provided him with a knife.  Later that same morning, Officer Hoffmann was stabbed to death by Clayton Fountain, after Hoffmann had pulled Fountain off another officer who was being attacked.

Permanent lockdown and the birth of the supermax 

As a result of the murders of Clutts and Hoffmann, USP Marion went into "permanent lockdown" for the next 23 years, which meant that all inmates were locked in their cells for the majority of the day.  All of USP Marion was effectively transformed into a "control unit" or supermax, meaning "super-maximum" security, prison.  This method of prison construction and operation involves the keeping of inmates in solitary confinement for 23 hours a day, and does not allow communal dining, exercising, or religious services.  These practices were used to keep prisoners under control and prevent prisoners from assaulting other prisoners or prison staff by severely limiting their contact with other people.

Years later, Norman Carlson, director of the Bureau of Prisons at the time of the Marion incident, said that ordering the permanent lockdown was the only way to deal with "a very small subset of the inmate population who show absolutely no concern for human life."  He pointed out that the two inmates who killed the guards were already serving multiple life sentences, so adding another would have had no effect.  The "control unit" model at Marion was later the basis for ADX Florence, which opened in 1994 as a specifically designed supermax prison.

Downgraded to medium-security prison

In 2006, USP Marion's designation was changed to a medium security prison and major renovations were made.  The renovations increased Marion's inmate population from 383 to 901.

Communication Management Unit
Although the facility no longer operates as a "supermax" facility, USP Marion is now home to one of two "Communication Management Units" in the federal prison system. The other is at the Federal Correctional Complex, Terre Haute, Indiana.  The Federal Bureau of Prisons created the Communication Management Unit (CMU) in response to criticism that it had not been adequately monitoring the communications of prisoners.  "By concentrating resources in this fashion, it will greatly enhance the agency's capabilities for language translation, content analysis and intelligence sharing," according to the Bureau's summary of the CMU. In a Democracy Now! interview on June 25, 2009, animal rights activist Andrew Stepanian talked about being jailed at the CMU. Stepanian is believed to be the first prisoner released from a CMU.

Notable inmates (current and former)
† Inmates who were released from custody prior to 1982 are not listed on the Federal Bureau of Prisons website.†† The Sentencing Reform Act of 1984 eliminated parole for most federal inmates. Inmates sentenced for offenses committed prior to 1987 are eligible for parole consideration.

Foreign Terrorists
Foreign citizens who committed or attempted terrorist attacks against United States citizens and interests.

Domestic Terrorists
American citizens who committed or attempted terrorist attacks against United States citizens and interests.

Organized crime figures

Others

See also

List of U.S. federal prisons
Federal Bureau of Prisons
Incarceration in the United States

References

External links 

 USP Marion

Marion
Prisons in Illinois
USP Marion
Supermax prisons
Buildings and structures in Williamson County, Illinois
1963 establishments in Illinois